Penstemon heterophyllus is a species of penstemon known by the common names bunchleaf penstemon, foothill penstemon, and foothill beardtongue. It is endemic to California.

The plant can be found in all of the major coastal mountain ranges and the northern Sierra Nevada foothills. It is a member of the flora in many local habitat types such as: hillsides, grasslands, chaparral, and open oak woodland and forest areas.

Description
Penstemon heterophyllus is a perennial herb producing upright, branching stems easily exceeding one meter in height and becoming woody at the bases. The leaves are variable in shape and may reach nearly 10 centimeters long. The inflorescence produces several wide-mouthed tubular flowers up to 4 centimeters in length. The flowers may be shades of blue or purple to nearly magenta.

Cultivation
Penstemon heterophyllus is cultivated as an ornamental plant by plant nurseries. It is used as a flowering perennial for traditional flower beds, and in native plant, drought-tolerant, and habitat gardens and public landscapes. It is a nectar source for (native) birds and butterflies.

Several cultivars have been selected for flower color and plant form, for use in Mediterranean climate and other low-water-use gardens, including: 
Penstemon heterophyllus 'Electric Blue' — intense blue flowers.
Penstemon heterophyllus 'Margarita BOP' — sky blue to reddish purple flowers.
Penstemon heterophyllus 'Blue Springs' — bright blue flowers.

References

External links
Jepson Manual Treatment — Penstemon heterophyllus
Penstemon heterophyllus — U.C. Photo gallery

heterophyllus
Endemic flora of California
Flora of the Klamath Mountains
Flora of the Sierra Nevada (United States)
Natural history of the California chaparral and woodlands
Natural history of the California Coast Ranges
Natural history of the Channel Islands of California
Natural history of the Peninsular Ranges
Natural history of the San Francisco Bay Area
Natural history of the Santa Monica Mountains
Natural history of the Transverse Ranges
Garden plants of North America
Drought-tolerant plants
Flora without expected TNC conservation status